Jeff Hall is a cartoon animator and director.  His projects include Race for your life, Charlie Brown.

Movies
Race For Your Life, Charlie Brown (1977)--animator
The Powerpuff Girls Movie (2002)--animator (uncredited)

References

External links
Jeff Hall at the Internet Movie Database

Year of birth missing (living people)
Living people
Place of birth missing (living people)
American animators
American animated film directors